Henry Wallace "Harry" Johnston (1871 – 1936) was a Scottish professional footballer who played as a wing half.

References

1871 births
1936 deaths
Footballers from Glasgow
Scottish footballers
Association football wing halves
Airdrieonians F.C. players
Clyde F.C. players
Sunderland A.F.C. players
Aston Villa F.C. players
Grimsby Town F.C. players
Gravesend United F.C. players
Third Lanark A.C. players
English Football League players
Scottish Football League players